Erçe Su Kasapoğlu (born 6 June 1996, İstanbul) is a Beşiktaş JK volleyball player. She is plays as libero.

Career

Awards

Clubs
 2013–14 Turkish Women's Volleyball League –  Bronze Medal, with Eczacıbaşı VitrA
 2014–15 Turkish Women's Volleyball Turkish Women's Volleyball First League -  Champion, with Yeşilyurt SK
 2018–19 CEV Women's Challenge Cup  Runner-Up, with Aydın Büyükşehir Belediyespor

See also
Turkish women in sports

References

1996 births
Living people
Turkish women's volleyball players
Turkish expatriate volleyball players
Volleyball players from Istanbul
Fenerbahçe volleyballers
Aydın Büyükşehir Belediyespor volleyballers